= Ashki Qomi =

Iranian poet (1533–1565)

Ashki Qomi (Persian: اشکی قمی; 1533 – 1565) was a poet in Safavid Iran during the reign of Shah Tahmasp I (r. 1524–1576).

== Sources ==
- Pazhoohandeh, Leila (2018). "اشکی قمی". The Great Islamic Encyclopaedia (in Persian).
